The British Rail Class 07 diesel locomotive is an off-centre cab 0-6-0 diesel-electric shunter type built by Ruston & Hornsby in 1962 for the Southern Region of British Railways. The 14 members of the class were primarily used at Southampton Docks and later also at Eastleigh Works.

Background

The 07 class was originally designed to replace steam power on the Southampton Docks network, which at its peak consisted of some 80 miles of track and immediately prior to the introduction of diesel power was operated by six ex-LBSCR 0-6-0 class E2 and fourteen ex-Southern Railway USA class 0-6-0 tank locomotives. 

The specifications for the class arose from a report produced by the General Managers of British Transport Docks and the Southern Region of British Railways, in which the relative merits of the 204 hp Class 04 and 350 hp Class 12 0-6-0 diesel shunters were discussed. Due to the need to traverse small radius curves on the docks network, it was concluded that a compromise between the shorter wheelbase of the former and greater power output of the latter was desirable, thus giving rise to the requirement for a locomotive with a fixed wheelbase not exceeding 10 ft and maximum power output of around 275 hp to 300 hp (with a weight not exceeding 10 tons).

Operation
The class was notorious for having the axleboxes run hot when travelling at high speed. This was initially encountered during delivery of the first locomotive, and subsequent deliveries were made by road. A later trial move of one Class 07 to Selhurst Depot for tyre profiling also resulted in overheating axlebox problems and all subsequent moves of any distance, particularly those to British Rail Engineering Limited workshops, were made by road. This is in contrast to other shunter classes that would commonly have had their coupling rods removed and traction motors isolated and would then form part of a train heading in the appropriate direction. Class 08s were commonly moved in this fashion at up to  – overnight wagon-load trains being utilised if possible.

For operation at Southampton Docks, the class was based in the former steam shed in the Old Docks near the River Itchen, work being carried out there by a fitter sent from Eastleigh.

The members of the class that had TOPS numbering applied were also equipped with high-level air brake pipes, allowing them to move Southern Region electric multiple units, and three locomotives were used at Bournemouth EMU Depot for a period. This was not their principal work, but they were often employed around their home depot on general shunting duties. They were relatively fast for shunters and it was envisaged that they would be used to trip local traffic to/from Southampton docks. Accordingly, they were equipped, from new, with mainline headcode marker lights (six for the SR). In practice they were seldom used for this because of the hot axlebox problem, which also affected the possibility of the class working away from either Southampton Docks or Eastleigh Works.

Withdrawal
Numbers 2988, 2992 and 2998 were withdrawn from BR service without bearing TOPS numbers, and were cut up at Eastleigh Works; 2988 in 1973, 2992 and 2998 in 1976. 2991, which was allocated the number 07007, was also withdrawn from capital stock before bearing its TOPS number, but remained in use at Eastleigh Works. Of the locos to bear TOPS numbers, 07003 and 07009 were withdrawn in 1976, and sold to P Wood of Queenborough, Kent; 07009 was exported to Italy, and 07003 was sold to British Industrial Sand at Oakamoor, Staffordshire, being subsequently scrapped in 1985. 07010 was sold directly into preservation, and the remaining locos were sold for industrial use during 1976 and 1977: 07001 to Staveley Limeworks, Buxton; 07002/6/12 to Powell Duffryn, Kidwelly (where 07002 and 07006 were scrapped in the 1980s); 07013 to Dow Chemical Company, King's Lynn.

Post-BR use and preservation

The locomotives were short-lived and this class had been withdrawn by British Rail by the end of 1977. Several were bought for industrial use and have subsequently passed into preservation.  Two locomotives, no. 07001,  owned by Harry Needle Railroad Company (HNRC), and 07007, owned by Knights Rail Services, are mainline registered. All surviving locomotives are listed below.
 07001 - Formerly HNRC, now preserved by Heritage Shunters Trust at Peak Rail. Fully operational, currently repainted into a blue livery with 'wasp' ends but without numbering (as of 1 September 2013).
 07005 - Preserved at the Great Central Railway
 07007 - In use by Knights Rail Services at Eastleigh Works. Mainline registered in April 2008. Currently painted in Rail Blue livery.
 07010 - Preserved on Avon Valley Railway in BR Blue livery. Currently awaiting repairs following electrical failure December 2014. Repainted into BR Blue September 2013.
 07011 - Privately owned at St Leonards TMD. Rail Blue livery.
 07012 - Formerly HNRC, now preserved at Barrow Hill.
 07013 - Formerly HNRC, externally restored in Rail Blue livery Now at the East Lancashire Railway.

Summary of life

Technical details
 Engine: Ruston/Paxman 6RPHL Mk. 3, 60° V6, 29.3-litre, 6-cylinder, indirect injection, 4-stroke
 Main Generator: AEI RTB6652
 Traction motor: AEI RTA6652, spigot mounted on a double reduction, axle-hung, final drive gearbox

Locomotive (air) and train (vacuum) brakes were fitted from new. Air train braking was added later, in some cases with high-level air brake pipes for use with Southern Region electric multiple units. Originally the class had radio communication sets fitted for use at Southampton Docks, the aerial located on the top right-hand corner of the engine bonnet. These were removed when operation at the docks ceased.

Models 
Class 07 is available as a kit and a ready-to-run model in OO gauge by Heljan.

Notes

References

Further reading

07
Ruston & Hornsby locomotives
C locomotives
Railway locomotives introduced in 1962
Standard gauge locomotives of Great Britain
Diesel-electric locomotives of Great Britain
Shunting locomotives